WSR may refer to:

 Warren and Saline River Railroad in Arkansas, United States
 Water speed record
 Weather surveillance radar
 West Somerset Railway in England
 West Surrey Racing, a UK-based motorsport team
 West Sussex Railway in England
 Wii Sports Resort, a 2009 sports video game developed and published by Nintendo
 Wild and Scenic River, a federal lands designation in the United States
 Woodsmoor railway station (UK railway station code WSR)
 World Series by Renault
 Waist-to-stature ratio
 Windows Speech Recognition — a speech recognition component introduced in Windows Vista